Kathu is a district (amphoe) of Phuket province, Thailand. The district is in the west of Phuket Island. It borders Thalang to the north, Mueang Phuket to the east and south, and the Andaman Sea to the west.

Geography
Kathu is the district which includes the tourist beach of Patong. Kamala Beach to the north is much less developed.

History
On 5 December 1938 the district was downgraded to a minor district (king amphoe) and became a subordinate of Mueang Phuket district. It was upgraded to a full district again on 10 December 1959.

During the King Mongkut (Rama IV)'s regin in early Rattanakosin period, Kathu has experienced tragedy when two Chinese triad gangs were killed here. Mueang Phuket gangsters has lured Kathu gangsters to eat here and seize the opportunity to burn them alive, 413 people were killed and only one survived. Nowadays, a shrine has been established to dedicate to them, named Tong Yong Su (pinyin: zhōngyǒng cí), which means "the shrine of courageous and upright ancestors".

Administration
The district is divided into three sub-districts (tambons), which are further subdivided into 14 villages (mubans). Patong has town (thesaban mueang) status, Kathu has sub-district municipality (thesaban tambon) status, and Kamala is led by a tambon administrative organization (TAO). Each of the municipalities has the name of the sub-district.

References

External links

amphoe.com

Kathu